is a Japanese former singer and actress. Watanabe started her career as a member of the idol girl group AKB48 under Team B. In the annual AKB48 General Elections event, she had consistently been voted by fans to rank among the group's top members. She has released five solo singles, many of which have peaked in the top ten in the Oricon charts, and one solo album. She left the group on the last day of 2017 and on the first day of 2018 and pursued as an acting career until her retirement from the entertainment industry in June 2020.

Career

AKB48 
Watanabe auditioned for AKB48's 3rd generation and was placed in the newly formed Team B, in which she had been the face of since formation. Her official nickname, Mayuyu, was coined by then fellow member Rumi Yonezawa. Her selection on "Bingo!" marked the first appearance of a Team B member in an AKB48 single title track. Except when the lineups were determined by rock-paper-scissors tournaments, she has appeared on all the A-sides for the group's singles since then.

In 2009, she placed fourth overall in the group's first general election to determine the line-up for the group's 13th single. She placed fifth overall the next year for the group's 17th single.

She appeared on the cover of the December 2010 issue of UP to boy magazine together with Airi Suzuki from Cute. That was the first gravure collaboration between Hello! Project and AKB48.

On May 13, 2011 she released her photo book, Mayuyu.  She commented that the book "is filled with a lot of expressions that I haven't shown until now, it's a book I'm really pleased with!" Regarding her cover picture, she said, "Despite being embarrassed, I did my best on the front cover, so I want a lot of people to look at it!" For AKB48's general election in 2011, Watanabe placed fifth overall.

In 2012, Watanabe got her first lead role in the Japanese TV drama Saba Doru, where she played a 38-year-old high school teacher who is hated by her pupils, whilst having a hidden life as the highly popular idol Mayu Watanabe, based on her real-life self. On February 29, Watanabe released her debut solo single, "Synchro Tokimeki", which is also the opening theme for the drama.

Watanabe participated as a voice actress in the anime series AKB0048. In the anime, she plays a main character Chieri Sono, and is part of the AKB48 subgroup NO NAME, which sings the opening and ending themes for the series. The series features a supporting character, Mayu Watanabe Mark 3, which is modeled after her likeness, and is voiced by Yukari Tamura. She reprised her role as Chieri Sono for the series' second season which aired in 2013.

Watanabe ranked second overall at the 2012 AKB48 general elections with 72,574 votes. On August 24, during the group's reorganization announcement at the AKB48's Tokyo Dome concert, she was moved from Team B to Team A.

On July 25, she released her second solo single, "Otona Jellybeans" which reached number three on the Oricon weekly chart. Her third solo single "Hikaru Monotachi" was released on November 21, 2012, and reached number one in the Oricon singles chart. The single was released in five versions, including one that has an illustration book. Her B-side "Sayonara no Hashi" was the theme song to the anime film Nerawareta Gakuen for which she voiced one of the lead characters. In July 2013, she released her fourth solo single. "Rappa Renshūchū". A contest was held to determine the cover artwork for one of its editions.

Meanwhile, in AKB48, she received her first center position on the group's 30th single "So Long!", which was released on February 20, 2013. On April 19, she released her second photobook Seifuku Zukan Saigo no Seifuku. In the AKB48 election for the members for their 32nd major label single, she placed third overall with 101,210 votes.

In 2014, Watanabe become a regular on the television show Utage!, and semi-regular on the TV show Renai Sosenkyo. In AKB48, she was transferred back from Team A to Team B in the "Daisokaku Matsuri". She performed an hour-long solo live concert at AKB48's Natsu matsuri. In the elections to determine the member line-up for AKB48's 37th major label single, she placed first, with 159,854 votes. Thus, she took centre position for the song "Kokoro no Placard".

In 2015, Watanabe received her first leading role in a prime-time TV drama, Tatakau! Shoten Girl, broadcast by Fuji TV and Kansai TV. This drama aired from April 2015, at 10 pm. The theme song for this drama, "Deai no Tsuzuki", was sung by Watanabe, and was also released as her fifth solo single on June 10, 2015. She held solo live concerts to support the single on September 19.  In 2015, a web poll conducted by My Navi Student declared her the second Cutest Idol from both the men's choices and women's choices lists, behind Kanna Hashimoto of the idol group Rev. from DVL.

On October 26, 2016, Watanabe released her third photobook "Shiranai uchi ni".

On June 17, 2017, Watanabe announced at the 9th General Election she will graduate from the group. On October 31, Watanabe had her graduation concert. Later she had her last handshake on November 18, 2017. She performed at the AKB48 theatre for the last time on December 26, 2017. She sang and performed on the stage of the "68th NHK Kouhaku Uta Gassen" on December 31, 2017, and it was her last activity as a member of AKB48.

AKB48 General Elections 

the results of annual ranking
 Ranked 4th in the 2009 General Election (1st) 
 Ranked 5th in the 2010 General Election (2nd)
 Ranked 5th in the 2011 General Election (3rd)
 Ranked 2nd in the 2012 General Election (4th)
 Ranked 3rd in the 2013 General Election (5th)
 Ranked 1st in the 2014 General Election (6th)
 Ranked 3rd in the 2015 General Election (7th)
 Ranked 2nd in the 2016 General Election (8th)
 Ranked 2nd in the 2017 General Election (9th)

Post-AKB48 
In January 2018, it was announced that Watanabe would play the titular character in the Japanese production of the Amélie adapted from the movie of the same title. The production ran from May 18 to June 3 at the Galaxy Theater in Shinagawa, Tokyo, and June 7–10 at the Morinomiya Piloti Hall in Osaka.

In April 2018, Watanabe had her first drama post-AKB48 titled  where she played an insurance investigator.

In August 2018, Watanabe starred in the special drama , a continuation from the same series in 2017.

Following two special dramas, Watanabe then had the lead role in a late-night drama  in August 2018. Her character, Hikari, was a girl whose dream was to become a musical actress, but got her dreams smashed when her brother supposedly committed murder.

In late 2018, Watanabe also endorsed the brand Yakult. The commercial was directed by Ikeda Kazumasa who has directed music videos for Keyakizaka46 and Nogizaka46, while choreography was by Sasao Isao who choreographed one of Keyakizaka46's singles. The commercial also features some 33 professional dancers and performers including Spinboy Aichi, SORI and HICKY of the dance team SHIFFLE!! among others.

Watanabe also guested several music shows, namely Utacon and UTAGE. In Utacon, she sang musical songs, including collaborations with several famed musical actors.

Towards the end of 2018, Watanabe was named the ambassador for JAL Honolulu Marathon.

On June 1, 2020, Production Ogi announced her retirement from the entertainment industry due to health reasons. Her website was terminated amicably on the same day.

Personal life 

Tokyo Mode describes Watanabe as a girl who used to be an "otaku obsessed with illustrations, anime, and special effects shows". Her public appearances are often accompanied by life-sized animated characters and many fans wear such costumes at her meet-and-greet events. In several episodes of the AKB48 variety show AKBingo!, she demonstrated her specialty of drawing various manga characters in seconds. She also unofficially endorsed the character Pompompurin for the 30th Sanrio Character Awards in 2015.

She is a musical theater enthusiast and attends performances both in Japan and overseas. She has also performed with the all-female troupe Takarazuka Revue.

Discography

Solo singles 

* RIAJ Digital Track Chart was established in April 2009 and cancelled in July 2012.

Solo albums

AKB48

with Watarirouka Hashiritai

Appearances

Stage units 
Team B 1st Stage 
 
 
Team B 2nd Stage 
 
 
 
 
 
Team B 3rd Stage 
 
Team B 4th Stage 
 
Team B 5th Stage 
 
Team A Waiting Stage 
 
 
  (new units)
Team Surprise 1st Stage 
 
 
 
Team B 3rd Stage  (revival)
 
Team Surprise 2nd Stage 
 
 
Kizaki Team B Stage  (original stage is Team A 4th Stage)

Variety 
 AKB 1ji 59fun (2008)
 AKB 0ji 59fun (2008)
  (2008–2016 )
 AKBingo! (2008–2017 )
  (2009–2012)
 Naruhodo High School (2011–2012 )
 Gachigase AKB (2012–)
 Kayoukyoku (2012–)
 GIRLS' FACTORY (2012)
 Generation Tengoku (2013-2014)
 UTAGE! (2014-2015)
 Momm!! (2015-2016)
 Tribecca (2016)
 Green & Blacks (2017)

Dramas 
 Majisuka Gakuen (2010) – Nezumi
  (2011) – Herself
 Majisuka Gakuen 2 (2011) – Nezumi
 Saba Doru (2012) – Herself, Usa Shijimi
 So Long! (2013) – Herself
 Fortune Cookies (2013) – Herself
 Sailor Zombie (2014) – Member of idol group, Milk Planet; Mayu
 Majisuka Gakuen 4 (2015) – Nezumi (ep.10)
 Tatakau! Shoten Girl (2015) – Kitamura Aki
 Majisuka Gakuen 5 (2015) – Nezumi (ep.2)
 AKB Horror Night: Adrenaline's Night Ep.7 - Elevator (2015) - Mayumi
 Ōoku (2016) - Oshima
 Crow's Blood (2016) - Kaori Isozaki
 Chihoushi wo Kau Onna (2016) - Yukino
 AKB Love Night Koi Koujou (2016) - Amelia (ep.35)
 Cabasuka Gakuen (2016) - Nezumi (Utsubo) (ep.3)
 Sayonara, Enari-kun (2017) - Kiriyama Saori
 Meibugyou! Tooyama no Kinshirou (2017) - Otane
 Gan Shoumetsu no Wana ~Kanzen Kankai no Nazo~ (2018) - Mizushima Ruriko
 Itsuka Kono Ame ga Yamu Hi Made (2018) - Kitazono (Morimura) Hikari
 Meibugyou! Tooyama no Kinshirou (2018) - Otane
 Kishuhanshu Tokugawa Yoshimune (2019) - Ichi
 Natsuzora (2019) - Akane Mimura

Musicals 
 Amélie (2018) - Amélie
 City of Angels (2018) - Mallory Kingsley

Radio 
  (2008 – present, JOQR-AM)

Anime 
 AKB0048 (2012) – Chieri Sono
 Nerawareta Gakuen (2012 film) – Natsuki
 AKB0048 Next Stage (2013) – Chieri Sono
 Pikachu, Kore Nan no Kagi? (2014) - Narration
 Maho Girls PreCure! (2016) – herself

Movies 
 
 Percy Jackson: Sea of Monsters (2013) – Annabeth Chase (Japanese dub)

Photobooks 
 Mayuyu (2011)
 Seifuku Zukan Saigo no Seifuku (April 19, 2013)
 Shiranai uchi ni (October 25, 2016)

Others 
 MUSIC FAIR (2012-) - irregular guest appearances
 Jounetsu Tairiku (2015)
 N Kyo CLASSIC&POPS with SPECIAL ARTISTS (2016)
 Watanabe Mayu ~AKB48 Sotsugyou Made no 63nichi-kan ni Micchaku, Soshite Sono Mirai~ (2018)

References

External links 

  
 Mayu Watanabe's VEVO channel on YouTube
 Mayu Watanabe profile at Sony Music 
 Mayu Watanabe profile at AKB48  archived on 29 August 2017
 Official agency profile at Ogi Production 
  

1994 births
Living people
Japanese idols
AKB48 members
Japanese women pop singers
Actors from Saitama Prefecture
Sony Music Entertainment Japan artists
Musicians from Saitama Prefecture
21st-century Japanese women singers
21st-century Japanese singers
21st-century Japanese actresses
People from Saitama Prefecture